The R503 road is a regional road in Ireland which runs east–west from Thurles, County Tipperary to the N7 west of Limerick City.

See also
Roads in Ireland
National primary road
National secondary road

References
Roads Act 1993 (Classification of Regional Roads) Order 2006 – Department of Transport

Regional roads in the Republic of Ireland
Roads in County Tipperary